Rush Brown Jr. (June 27, 1954 – February 6, 2020) was a professional American football player who played defensive tackle for four seasons for the NFL's St. Louis Cardinals. He started 32 of his first 41 games, but appeared in only six of his last 16 games (with 1 start). Brown was selected to the NFL All-Rookie Team in 1980.

Brown attended Scotland High School in Laurinburg, North Carolina. He enlisted in the U.S Army right after high school. He was stationed in Europe, and was assigned to the 60th Ordnance Group in Zweibrucken, Germany. Brown was invited to play football in the U.S Air Force, since there was no football team in the U.S Army. He later was named the 1975 Player of the Year in the United States Air Force of Europe football league. While playing football for the U.S Air Force, Brown attracted attention from a professor who encouraged him to attend Ball State University. Rush ended his military career as a second lieutenant before pursuing an education at Ball State. 

Brown died on February 6, 2020, at age 65.

References

1954 births
2020 deaths
American football defensive linemen
St. Louis Cardinals (football) players
Ball State Cardinals football players
United States Air Force officers